Robert George Bedell (June 26, 1944 – June 14, 2015) was an American basketball player.

Born in Los Angeles, California, he attended Bell Gardens High School, played collegiately for Stanford University, and was selected by the Philadelphia 76ers in the 10th round (90th overall) of the 1966 NBA Draft.

He played for the Anaheim Amigos (1967–68), Dallas/Texas Chaparrals (1968–71) in the American Basketball Association for 269 games.

Bedell died on June 14, 2015 at the age of 70.

References

1944 births
2015 deaths
American men's basketball players
Anaheim Amigos players
Basketball players from Los Angeles
Dallas Chaparrals players
Philadelphia 76ers draft picks
Power forwards (basketball)
Stanford Cardinal men's basketball players
Texas Chaparrals players